The Kisan Express is an Express train belonging to North Central Railway zone that runs between  and  in India. It is currently being operated with 04732 train numbers on a daily basis.

Service

The 14519/Kisan Express has an average speed of 47 km/hr and covers 337 km in 7h 10m. (-without halt time 56 km/h) The 14520/Kisan Express has an average speed of 46 km/hr and covers 337 km in 7h 20m.

Schedule

Route and halts 

The important halts of the train are:

Coach composition

The train has standard ICF rakes with max speed of 110 kmph. The train consists of 14 coaches:

 1 AC Chair Car 
 4 Chair Car 
 7 General
 2 Seating cum Luggage Rake

Traction

Kissan express is hauled by a Diesel Loco Shed, Bhagat Ki Kothi-based WDP-4D diesel locomotive from Bathinda to Bhiwani and Gaziabad-based WAP-5 from Bhiwani to Delhi.

Direction reversal

The train reverses its direction 1 times:

See also 

 Bathinda Junction railway station
 Old Delhi railway station
 Sirsa Express

Notes

References

External links 

 14519/Kisan Express
 14520/Kisan Express

Transport in Delhi
Transport in Bathinda
Named passenger trains of India
Rail transport in Delhi
Rail transport in Haryana
Rail transport in Punjab, India
Express trains in India